Manjoi is a state constituency in Perak, Malaysia, that has been represented in the Perak State Legislative Assembly since 1995.

The state constituency was created in the 1994 redistribution and is mandated to return a single member to the Perak State Legislative Assembly under the first past the post voting system.

Demographics

History

Polling districts
According to the gazette issued on 30 March 2018, the Manjoi constituency has a total of 18 polling districts.

Representation history

Election results

References

Perak state constituencies